Zakaria Erzinçlioğlu (30 December 1951 – 26 September 2002), also known as Dr Zak, was a renowned forensic entomologist. He used his expertise in insect biology in criminal investigations and solved more than 200 murders, earning him an international reputation.

Early life
Erzinçlioglu was born on 30 December 1951 in Hungary to parents of Turkish origin. He was brought up in Egypt, Sudan, and England.

He earned a degree in applied zoology from Wolverhampton Polytechnic in 1975, and then began working for the Zoological Society of London. He then studied for his doctorate at Durham University. In 1984 Erzinçlioğlu moved to Cambridge University where he wrote about blowflies for The Naturalists' Handbooks series, as well as writing for other publications. He also received funding to do research in forensic entomology and later was appointed director of a new Forensic Research Center at Durham University.

Books
During the last years of his life, Erzinçlioglu spent time writing books from his home. Maggots, Murder and Men (2000) was the runner-up in the Crime Writers' Association 2001 Silver Dagger Award for non-fiction. He also wrote Every Contact Leaves a Trace (2001), as well as the children's story Ivo of the Black Mountain and a murder mystery Jackdraw Crag.

Television
Erzinçlioğlu participated in several television programmes on forensic science, including The Witness was a Fly on the BBC.

Awards
He was awarded the John Grundy Medal for medical entomology by the Royal Army Medical College.

Personal life
Erzinçlioğlu married Sharon Wynne Davies in 1984. He had one son and two daughters.

He died on 26 September 2002 of a heart attack in England.

References

1951 births
2002 deaths
Hungarian people of Turkish descent
Hungarian emigrants to England
English people of Turkish descent
20th-century British zoologists
Hungarian forensic scientists
Hungarian entomologists
British forensic scientists
British entomologists
Alumni of the University of Wolverhampton
Academics of the University of Cambridge
Academics of Durham University
Alumni of Durham University Graduate Society